Khumalo may refer to
 Khumalo clan, African clan
 Khumalo gang, former armed group in the Joe Slovo section in South Africa
 Alf Khumalo (1930–2012), South African photographer
 Bongani Khumalo (born 1987), South African footballer
 Doctor Khumalo (born 1967), retired South African soccer player
 Fred Khumalo (born 1966), South African journalist and author
 Kelly Khumalo (born 1984), South African singer and actress 
 Leleti Khumalo (born 1970), Zulu South African actress
 Lobengula Khumalo (1845–1894), second and last king of the Ndebele people
 Marwick Khumalo (living), member of the House of Assembly of Swaziland
 Mbongeni Khumalo (born 1976), South African performance poet and writer
 Moses Khumalo (1979–2006), South African jazz saxophonist
 Mzi Khumalo (born 1955), South African businessman and mining entrepreneur
 Mzilikazi Khumalo (ca. 1790–1868), founding king of the Ndebele people
 Nomalanga Khumalo (living), Zimbabwean politician
 Sibusiso Khumalo (footballer, born 1989) (born 1989), South African footballer
 Sibusiso Khumalo (footballer, born 1991) (born 1989), South African footballer
 Sibongile Khumalo (1957–2021), South African singer
 Thabiso Khumalo (born 1980), South African footballer
 Usimaka Walter Khumalo (born 1972), South African footballer

See also
Kumalo